Haber "Habs" Amin Asarul (LKS-KAM) is a Filipino politician current mayor Sumisip in Basilan (2010–13).

References

Lakas–CMD politicians
Mayors of places in Basilan
Living people
Year of birth missing (living people)
Place of birth missing (living people)
Filipino Muslims